The 1898–99 Wisconsin Badgers men's basketball team represented University of Wisconsin–Madison. Wisconsin Badger basketball began in December 1898 with the formation of its first team coached by Dr. James C. Elsom. The team played their home games at the Red Gym in Madison, Wisconsin and was a member of the Western Conference.

Schedule

|-

References

Wisconsin Badgers men's basketball seasons
Wisconsin
Wisconsin Badgers basketball team
Wisconsin Badgers basketball team